Paul Christopher Ramsey (born 3 September 1962 in Derry, Northern Ireland) is a former professional footballer and Northern Ireland international who played in a defensive midfield role. He featured for Northern Ireland in the 1986 FIFA World Cup.

Career
Ramsey, who measured 5' 10" in height, began his playing career at Derry City F.C. He later went on to play for Leicester City and made 14 international appearances for Northern Ireland between 1983 and 1989, as well as being chosen for the country's 1986 World Cup squad. In his younger days, he had won 4 schoolboy caps.

Ramsey moved to Cardiff City in August 1991, where he was appointed captain. During his last season at Cardiff, they managed to win the Third Division title.

Other former clubs of Ramsey's include St Johnstone, Telford United, Torqauy United, Merthyr Tydfil, KPV, Rothwell Town, Grantham Town and King's Lynn.

Honours
 Cardiff City
 Third Division winners (1): 1992-93

References

External links
 
 
 Welsh Premier profile

1962 births
Living people
Sportspeople from Derry (city)
Association footballers from Northern Ireland
Northern Ireland international footballers
Cardiff City F.C. players
St Johnstone F.C. players
Telford United F.C. players
Barry Town United F.C. players
Torquay United F.C. players
Leicester City F.C. players
1986 FIFA World Cup players
English Football League players
Scottish Football League players
Cymru Premier players
Association football midfielders